The Women's skeleton event in the IBSF World Championships 2016 was on 19 and 20 February 2016.

Results
Run 1 was started on 19 February at 09:49. and the last two runs on 20 February at 09:49.

References

Women
2016 in Austrian women's sport